This is a bibliography for Ayn Rand and Objectivism. Objectivism is a philosophical system initially developed in the 20th century by Rand.

Works by Rand
The lists below provide information on Rand's major works and collections. Where there are multiple editions, the primary information listed is for the first regular trade edition, with notes following about other editions if they involve revisions or additions to the content. For dramatic works, date of first production is used instead of date of first publication. Individual essays, short stories and other short items are not listed separately, but most are reproduced in the items below.

Fiction

Novels and short stories
 Ideal (written in 1934, published in 2015). NAL. .
 We the Living (1936). New York: Macmillan. Revised edition published by Random House in 1959. 60th anniversary edition published by New American Library in 1996, includes an introduction by Leonard Peikoff, .
 Anthem (1938). London: Cassell and Company. Revised edition published by Pamphleteers in 1946. 50th anniversary edition published by Dutton in 1995, includes the revised edition text plus a facsimile of the first edition, .
 The Fountainhead (1943). New York: Bobbs-Merrill. 25th anniversary edition published by New American Library in 1971, includes a new introduction by Rand. 50th anniversary edition published by Bobbs-Merrill in 1993, includes an afterword by Leonard Peikoff, .
 Atlas Shrugged (1957). New York: Random House. 35th anniversary edition published by Dutton in 1992, includes an introduction by Leonard Peikoff, .
 The Early Ayn Rand: A Selection from Her Unpublished Fiction (1984). Leonard Peikoff, ed. New York: New American Library. . Expanded second edition published in 2005, .

Drama
 Night of January 16th (1934). Stage play. Produced in Los Angeles as Woman on Trial, then on Broadway as Night of January 16th. Player's book and director's manuscript with edits by Nathaniel Edward Reeid published in 1936. Revised version by Rand published by The World Publishing in 1968.
 The Unconquered (1940). Stage adaptation of We the Living. Two versions of the script, edited by Robert Mayhew, published by Palgrave Macmillan in 2014
 Love Letters (1945). Screenplay.
 You Came Along (1945). Screenplay, co-written with Robert Smith.
 The Fountainhead (1949). Screenplay adaptation of her own novel.
 Ideal (1989). New York: New American Library. . Stage play, published in The Early Ayn Rand prior to first production.
 Three Plays (2005). Richard E. Ralston, ed. New York: New American Library. . Anthology of plays, including Night of January 16th, Ideal, and Think Twice.

Non-fiction books
 For the New Intellectual: The Philosophy of Ayn Rand (1961). New York: Random House.
 The Virtue of Selfishness: A New Concept of Egoism (1964). New York: New American Library. Includes essays by Nathaniel Branden. Introduction was revised in 1970.
 Capitalism: The Unknown Ideal (1966). New York: New American Library. Includes essays by Nathaniel Branden, Alan Greenspan, and Robert Hessen. Expanded second edition published by New American Library in 1967. Introduction was revised in 1970.
 The Romantic Manifesto: A Philosophy of Literature (1969). New York: The World Publishing. Expanded second edition published by New American Library in 1975.
 The New Left: The Anti-Industrial Revolution (1971). New York: New American Library. Expanded second edition published by New American Library in 1975. See also Return of the Primitive below.
 Introduction to Objectivist Epistemology (1979). New York: New American Library. . Includes an essay by Leonard Peikoff. A booklet of Rand's title essay was published by The Objectivist in 1967. Expanded second edition published by Meridian in 1990, edited by Harry Binswanger and Leonard Peikoff, .

 Philosophy: Who Needs It (1982). Leonard Peikoff, ed. New York: Bobbs-Merrill. .
 The Voice of Reason: Essays in Objectivist Thought (1989). Leonard Peikoff, ed. New York: New American Library. . Includes essays by Leonard Peikoff and Peter Schwartz.
 The Ayn Rand Column: Written for the Los Angeles Times (1991). Peter Schwartz, ed. Oceanside, California: Second Renaissance Books. . Expanded second edition published by Second Renaissance Books in 1998, . A collection of twenty-six newspaper columns that Rand wrote for the Los Angeles Times from 1962 on, as well as six essays (with an additional three in the revised edition).
 Ayn Rand's Marginalia: Her Critical Comments on the Writings of Over 20 Authors (1995). Robert Mayhew, ed. New Milford, Connecticut: Second Renaissance Books. 
 Letters of Ayn Rand (1995). Michael S. Berliner, ed. New York: Dutton. . Includes an introduction by Leonard Peikoff.
 Journals of Ayn Rand (1997). David Harriman, ed. New York: Dutton. . Includes a foreword by Leonard Peikoff.
 The Ayn Rand Reader (1999) Gary Hull and Leonard Peikoff, eds. New York: Plume. .
 Return of the Primitive: The Anti-Industrial Revolution (1999). Peter Schwartz, ed. New York: Meridian. . Revised edition of Rand's earlier book, The New Left, and includes essays by Schwartz.
 Russian Writings on Hollywood (1999). Michael S. Berliner, ed.; Dina Garmong, trans. Los Angeles: Ayn Rand Institute Press. . Reproduces and translates two booklets previously published in Russia without Rand's knowledge.
 Why Businessmen Need Philosophy (1999). Richard E. Ralston, ed. Los Angeles: Ayn Rand Institute Press. . Includes essays by Leonard Peikoff, Harry Binswanger, Edwin A. Locke, John Ridpath, Richard M. Salsman, and Jaana Woiceshyn.
 The Art of Fiction: A Guide for Writers and Readers (2000). Tore Boeckmann, ed. New York: Plume. . Includes an introduction by Leonard Peikoff.
 The Art of Nonfiction: A Guide for Writers and Readers (2001). Robert Mayhew, ed. New York: Plume. . Includes an introduction by Peter Schwartz.
 Ayn Rand Answers: The Best of Her Q & A (2005). Robert Mayhew, ed. New York: New American Library. .

Periodicals edited by Ayn Rand

 The Objectivist Newsletter. Vols. 1–4. 1962–1965. Co-edited with Nathaniel Branden.
 The Objectivist. Vols. 5–10. 1966–1971. Co-edited with Nathaniel Branden through the April 1968 issue (Volume 7, Issue 4), then solely by Rand. Volume numbering carried over from The Objectivist Newsletter.
 The Ayn Rand Letter. Vols. 1–4. 1971–1976.

Books about Rand or Objectivism
The books listed below are either entirely about Ayn Rand/Objectivism or contain multiple relevant chapters/essays. The main body of the list consists of books about Objectivist ideas published by academic, commercial or institutional presses. A special subsection lists books about Rand's life and writing. For books with a single relevant chapter or essay, see the list of other works below.
 
 
 
 
 
 
 
 
 
 
 
 
 
 
 
  Revised and retitled edition of a 1968 book, originally titled Is Objectivism a Religion?
 
 
 
 
 
  With an introduction by Leonard Peikoff.
 
 
 
  Revised and retitled edition of a 1990 book, originally titled Truth and Toleration.
 
 
 
 
 
 
 
 
 
 
 
 
 
 
 
  Revised and retitled edition of a 1974 book, originally titled Answer to Ayn Rand.

Biography and literary analysis
The books below focus on Ayn Rand's life or her literary works.
 
 
  Revised and retitled edition of a 1989 book, originally titled Judgment Day.
 
 
 
 
 
  Revised and retitled edition of a 1984 book, originally titled The Ayn Rand Companion.

Other works about Rand or Objectivism 
The works listed below include articles, pamphlets, individual chapters of books, and materials in non-print media. Articles reproduced in books listed above are not included on this list.
 
 
 
 
 
 
 
 
 
  Based on a lecture given to the Ayn Rand Society at the American Philosophical Association on December 29, 1995.
 Hospers, John:
 "Memories of Ayn Rand"
 "Conversations With Ayn Rand" Part 1 by John Hospers (Originally published in Liberty, 1987)
 Part 2 (Originally published in Liberty, 1987)
 
 
 
 
  Reprinted in Nozick, Socratic Puzzles, 1997, .
 
 
 Menaul, Christopher, director (1998) The Passion of Ayn Rand. (Dramatisation of Barbara Branden's The Passion of Ayn Rand; released as a motion picture in 1999; leading players: Helen Mirren, Eric Stoltz, Peter Fonda)

Objectivist periodicals 

 The Intellectual Activist (1979–2010). Peter Schwartz editor (1979–1991), Robert Stubblefield editor (1991–1996), Robert Tracinski editor (1996–2010). Published fortnightly to September 1991; then bi-monthly to November 1998; monthly thereafter.
 The Objectivist Forum. Vols 1–8, 1980–1987. Harry Binswanger, editor and publisher; Leonard Peikoff, consulting editor. Published bi-monthly.
 Full Context. Vols 1–13, 1988–2000. Karen (Reedstrom) Minto, editor. Published monthly to June 1998; bi-monthly thereafter.
 Objectivity. Vols 1–2, 1990–1998. Stephen C. Boydstun, editor. Published occasionally.
 The Journal of Ayn Rand Studies (1999–  ). R.W. Bradford (until his death in 2005), Stephen D. Cox, Roderick Long (replacing Bradford), and Chris Matthew Sciabarra, editors. Published semi-annually.
 The Undercurrent (2005– ). Various student editors. Published occasionally.
 The Objective Standard (2006–  ). Craig Biddle, editor and publisher. Published quarterly.

References

External links
 Chronology & Bibliography of Ayn Rand's Life & Works – Detailed chronological listing of Rand's articles, books, lectures and other works

Bibliography
Rand
Books about Ayn Rand